Cryptanaerobacter is a genus in the phylum Bacillota (Bacteria).

Etymology
The name Cryptanaerobacter derives from: Greek cryptos (κρυπτός), hidden; an (ἄν), not; aer, aeros (ἀήρ, ἀέρος), air; New Latin, a rod bacter, nominally meaning "a rod", but in effect meaning a bacterium, rod; giving  Cryptanaerobacter, an anaerobic rod that is hidden within the consortium.

Species 
The genus contains a single species, Cryptanaerobacter phenolicus (Juteau et al. 2005,  (ype species of the genus). The specific name is from Latin phenol, phenol; icus, suffix used in adjectives with the sense of belonging to; giving phenolicus, belonging to phenol.)

See also 
 Bacterial taxonomy
 Microbiology

References 

Peptococcaceae
Monotypic bacteria genera
Bacteria genera